S/2009 S 1 is a moonlet embedded in the outer part of Saturn's B Ring, orbiting  away from the planet. The moonlet was discovered by the Cassini Imaging Team during the Saturnian equinox event on 26 July 2009, when the Cassini spacecraft imaged the moonlet casting a -long shadow onto the B Ring.

Discovery 

The moonlet was discovered during Saturn's 2009 equinox, when it cast an approximately -long shadow on the planet's B ring.

Characteristics 
This particular moon is one of the smallest moons of Saturn that has been directly imaged.

Although it is embedded in the B ring,  does not appear to produce extensive, propeller-shaped disturbance features unlike the propeller moonlets in Saturn's A ring. This may be because the B ring is very dense at the moonlet's location, which would hinder the formation of visible propeller gaps around the moonlet.

See also 
 Moonlet
 Moons of Saturn
 Rings of Saturn

References 

20090726
Moons of Saturn
Rings of Saturn
Moons with a prograde orbit